The St. Francis River (French: Rivière Saint-François) is a river roughly  long, which forms part of the Canada–United States border. The portion that forms the boundary starts at the bottom of Lake Pohenegamook at the very northernmost point of New England between Estcourt Station, Maine, and Estcourt, Quebec. The river along the international boundary flows south and then south-east through two deep, narrow lakes to its mouth on the Saint John River at St. Francis, Maine/Saint-François-de-Madawaska, New Brunswick.

USS Bancroft (DD-256) became a Canadian ship as part of the Destroyers for Bases Agreement and was renamed after the St. Francis River to follow the Canadian tradition of naming destroyers after Canadian rivers while recognizing the shared national history of the ship.

Beau Lake

Saint Francis River passes through Beau Lake on the border between Maine and Quebec. Beau Lake is one of the deepest lakes in northern Maine. The lake is ideal habitat for lake trout, brook trout, and land-locked Atlantic salmon; but these species are in competition with a large population of yellow perch, and muskellunge are migrating into the lake from downstream.

Glazier Lake

Saint Francis River passes through Glazier Lake on the border between Maine and New Brunswick. Tributaries to the lake include Yankeetuladi Brook on the Maine side, and Canadian Tuladi Brook on the New Brunswick side. Glazier Lake is deep and narrow similar to Beau Lake, and offers similarly suitable habitat for lake trout, brook trout, salmon, and muskellunge.

See also

Lake Pohenegamook, a water body of Quebec
Saint-Hubert-de-Rivière-du-Loup, Quebec, a municipality
Saint-Honoré-de-Témiscouata, Quebec, a municipality
Pohénégamook, Quebec, a municipality
Rivière-Bleue, Quebec, a municipality
Témiscouata Regional County Municipality, in Quebec
Saint-François Parish, New Brunswick, a municipality
Madawaska County, a county of New Brunswick
Blue River (St. Francis River), a stream
Boucané River, a stream
Saint John River, a stream
List of rivers of Quebec
List of rivers of New Brunswick
List of rivers of Maine

References

Rivers of Bas-Saint-Laurent
Rivers of Madawaska County, New Brunswick
Borders of Maine
Tributaries of the Saint John River (Bay of Fundy)
Rivers of Aroostook County, Maine
International rivers of North America